Julianna Nicole Peña (born August 19, 1989) is an American professional mixed martial artist who competes in the bantamweight division of the Ultimate Fighting Championship, where she is the former UFC Women's Bantamweight Champion. Peña is the first woman to win The Ultimate Fighter. As of August 1, 2022, she is #1 in the UFC women's bantamweight rankings, and as of March 7, 2023, she is ranked #6 in the UFC women's pound-for-pound rankings.

Background
The youngest of four siblings, Julianna was born and raised in Spokane, Washington. Julianna graduated in 2007 from Mt. Spokane High School. She then attended Spokane Community College. In order to lose weight and channel aggression in her early adulthood, she enrolled in a cardio kickboxing class and subsequently transitioned to mixed martial arts.

Mixed martial arts career

Early career
After going 2–0 as an amateur, Peña made her professional MMA debut in May 2009. She won four consecutive fights but suffered her first defeat in April 2012 to future fellow The Ultimate Fighter 18 cast member Sarah Moras in a 140-pound catchweight bout.  The fight took place just two months and one week after Peña was involved in an accident with a drunk driver while walking in downtown Spokane in which she was knocked unconscious and suffered a broken nose.  Ten months later she returned to professional competition in a fight in the flyweight division, a move down from the bantamweight division, losing by unanimous decision.

The Ultimate Fighter
In August 2013, it was announced that Peña was one of the fighters selected to be on The Ultimate Fighter: Team Rousey vs. Team Tate.

Peña faced Gina Mazany in the elimination fight to get into the house. She controlled the fight from early on, winning a clear unanimous decision victory after two rounds.

During the first tournament fight in the house, Peña faced veteran and top-ten ranked Shayna Baszler.  Ronda Rousey selected this match-up between the two first female picks.  The highly ranked and more experienced Baszler was widely considered the favorite.  After a back and forth first round in which Peña landed effective boxing combinations and escaped several of Baszler's submission attempts, Peña came out hard in the second round, connecting with powerful knee strikes that staggered Baszler.  The fight went to the ground, where Peña was able to achieve back mount and won via rear naked choke for perhaps the biggest upset victory of the season.

In the semifinals, Peña faced off against Sarah Moras.  The two fought previously in a professional bout in 2012, with Peña losing after suffering an injury due to an armbar which forced the doctor to stop the bout between the second and third rounds.  Peña won the fight via guillotine choke in the second round to avenge the loss.

Ultimate Fighting Championship
Peña faced Jessica Rakoczy in the finals on November 30, 2013, at The Ultimate Fighter 18 Finale. She won the bout via TKO in the final seconds of the first round and became TUF 18 women’s bantamweight champion.

Injury
Peña was expected to face Jessica Andrade at UFC 171 on  March 15, 2014. However, Peña pulled out of the bout after suffering an injury to her right knee.  She suffered the injury while grappling in training, ultimately damaging, among other aspects, her ACL, MCL, LCL and meniscus. Despite the severity of the injury, doctors have assured Peña that her right knee will return to full strength following surgery and rehabilitation. The injury kept Peña out of action for the rest of 2014.

UFC return
Peña returned to face Milana Dudieva on April 4, 2015 at UFC Fight Night 63. She won the fight via TKO in the first round.  The win also earned Peña her first Performance of the Night bonus award.

Peña next faced Jessica Eye on October 3, 2015 at UFC 192. She won the fight by unanimous decision.

Peña faced former title challenger Cat Zingano at UFC 200 on July 9, 2016. She won the fight by unanimous decision.

Peña faced Valentina Shevchenko at UFC on Fox 23 on January 28, 2017. She lost the fight via armbar submission in the second round.

On October 14, 2017 Peña announced that she was pregnant and would be taking an indefinite hiatus from the sport. On July 13, 2019 at UFC Fight Night 155, nearly two and a half years from her last bout, she returned and faced former UFC Women's Flyweight Champion Nicco Montaño, replacing an injured Sara McMann. She won the fight via unanimous decision.

Peña was expected to face Aspen Ladd on March 28, 2020 at UFC on ESPN 8. However, Peña pulled out of the fight in early March citing an injury.

Peña faced Germaine de Randamie on October 4, 2020 at UFC on ESPN: Holm vs. Aldana. She lost the fight via a guillotine choke in round three.

Peña was expected to face Sara McMann on January 16, 2021 at UFC on ABC 1 before being pushed back a week later to UFC 257 on January 24, 2021. Peña won the fight via submission in round three.

Peña was scheduled to face Holly Holm on May 8, 2021 at UFC on ESPN 24. However, Holm was forced to withdraw from the bout citing hydronephrosis.

Bantamweight champion
Peña was expected to face Amanda Nunes for the UFC Women's Bantamweight Championship on August 7, 2021 at UFC 265. However Nunes tested positive for COVID-19 on July 29, 2021. The bout was rescheduled to UFC 269 on December 11, 2021. After a dominant round one from Nunes, Peña came back in the second to win the bout and championship by rear-naked choke submission in what is regarded as one of the biggest upsets in UFC history.

On February 5, 2022,  it was announced that Peña and Nunes would be the coaches for The Ultimate Fighter 30 on ESPN+, which would feature contestants from the heavyweight and women's flyweight divisions.

A rematch against Amanda Nunes for the UFC Women's Bantamweight title took place on July 30, 2022, at UFC 277. Peña lost the fight by unanimous decision.

Film and television
Peña was featured in the award-winning mixed martial arts documentary Fight Life, the film is directed by James Z. Feng and was released in 2013.

Peña is an announcer, along with Max Bretos, for Combate Americas' English language broadcast on DAZN.

Personal life
Julianna is the younger sister of former KREM 2 reporter and morning/noon meteorologist Grace Peña. Peña is of Mexican and Venezuelan descent.

In January 2018, Peña gave birth to her first child, a daughter.

Legal issues
On  December 20, 2015, Peña was arrested in Spokane, Washington and charged with two counts of assault due to an altercation with bar staff following an earlier street fight in which Josh Gow, her training partner on the Sikjitsu fight team, had been injured. A judge later granted a stipulation order of continuance in her case such that if Peña had no other incidents for a year, the case would be dismissed.

Championships and accomplishments

Mixed martial arts
 Ultimate Fighting Championship
 UFC Women's Bantamweight Championship (One time)
 The Ultimate Fighter 18 Tournament Winner
 Performance of the Night (Two times) 
2021 Upset of the Year vs. Amanda Nunes
 MMAjunkie.com
 2021 January Submission of the Month vs. Sara McMann
 2021 December Submission of the Month vs. Amanda Nunes
2021 Upset of the Year vs. Amanda Nunes
 Cageside Press
 2021 Upset of the Year vs. Amanda Nunes
 LowKick MMA
 2021 Upset of the Year vs. Amanda Nunes
Sherdog
2021 Upset of the Year vs. Amanda Nunes
ESPN
2021 Female Fighter of the Year
Bleacher Report
2021 Upset of the Year vs. Amanda Nunes
MMA Sucka
2021 Upset of the Year vs. Amanda Nunes
Yahoo! Sports
2021 Submission of the Year vs. Amanda Nunes
Daily Mirror
2021 Upset of the Year vs. Amanda Nunes
Lowkick MMA
2021 Upset of the Year vs. Amanda Nunes
World MMA Awards
2022 Upset of the Year vs. Amanda Nunes at UFC 269

Mixed martial arts record

|-
|Loss
|align=center|11–5
|Amanda Nunes
|Decision (unanimous)
|UFC 277
|
|align=center|5
|align=center|5:00
|Dallas, Texas, United States
|
|-
|Win
|align=center|11–4
|Amanda Nunes
|Submission (rear-naked choke)
|UFC 269
|
|align=center|2
|align=center|3:26
|Las Vegas, Nevada, United States
|
|-
|Win
|align=center|10–4
|Sara McMann
|Submission (rear-naked choke)
|UFC 257 
|
|align=center|3
|align=center|3:39
|Abu Dhabi, United Arab Emirates
| 
|-
|Loss
|align=center|9–4
|Germaine de Randamie
|Technical submission (guillotine choke)
|UFC on ESPN: Holm vs. Aldana
|
|align=center|3
|align=center|3:25
|Abu Dhabi, United Arab Emirates
|
|-
|Win
|align=center|9–3
|Nicco Montaño
|Decision (unanimous)
|UFC Fight Night: de Randamie vs. Ladd 
|
|align=center|3
|align=center|5:00
|Sacramento, California, United States
|
|-
|Loss
|align=center|8–3
|Valentina Shevchenko
|Submission (armbar)
|UFC on Fox: Shevchenko vs. Peña
|
|align=center|2
|align=center|4:29
|Denver, Colorado, United States
|  
|-
|Win
|align=center|8–2
|Cat Zingano
|Decision (unanimous)
|UFC 200
|
|align=center|3
|align=center|5:00
|Las Vegas, Nevada, United States
|  
|-
|Win
|align=center|7–2
|Jessica Eye
|Decision (unanimous)
|UFC 192
|
|align=center|3
|align=center|5:00
|Houston, Texas, United States
|
|-
|Win
|align=center|6–2
|Milana Dudieva
|TKO (punches and elbows)
|UFC Fight Night: Mendes vs. Lamas
|
|align=center|1
|align=center|3:59
|Fairfax, Virginia, United States
|
|-
|Win
|align=center| 5–2
|Jessica Rakoczy
|TKO (punches)
|The Ultimate Fighter: Team Rousey vs. Team Tate Finale
|
|align=center|1
|align=center|4:59
|Las Vegas, Nevada, United States
|
|-
|Loss
|align=center| 4–2
|DeAnna Bennett
|Decision (unanimous)
|Showdown Fights 10
|
|align=center| 3
|align=center| 5:00
|Orem, Utah, United States
|
|-
|Loss
|align=center| 4–1
|Sarah Moras
|TKO (doctor stoppage)
|Conquest of the Cage 11
|
|align=center| 2
|align=center| 5:00
|Airway Heights, Washington, United States
|
|-
|Win
|align=center| 4–0
|Rachael Swatez
|Submission (guillotine choke)
|Conquest of the Cage 10
|
|align=center| 2
|align=center| 0:17
|Airway Heights, Washington, United States
|
|-
|Win
|align=center| 3–0
|Stephanie Webber
|Submission (armbar)
|CageSport 8
|
|align=center| 2
|align=center| 2:54
|Tacoma, Washington, United States
|
|-
|Win
|align=center| 2–0
|Robyn Dunne
|TKO (punches)
|IFC: Caged Combat
|
|align=center| 1
|align=center| N/A
|Penticton, British Columbia, Canada
| 
|-
|Win
|align=center| 1–0
|Raylene Harvey
|Submission (rear-naked choke)
|ExciteFight
|
|align=center| 1
|align=center| 2:58
|Spokane, Washington, United States
| 

|-
|Win
|align=center|3–0
|Sarah Moras
|Submission (guillotine choke)
|rowspan=3|The Ultimate Fighter: Team Rousey vs. Team Tate
| (air date)
|align=center|2
|align=center|3:31
|rowspan=3|Las Vegas, Nevada, United States
|
|-
|Win
|align=center|2–0
|Shayna Baszler
|Submission (rear-naked choke)
| (air date)
|align=center|2
|align=center|3:07
|
|-
|Win
|align=center|1–0
|Gina Mazany
|Decision (unanimous)
| (air date)
|align=center|2
|align=center|5:00
|

See also
 List of current UFC fighters
 List of female mixed martial artists

References

External links
 
 
 

1989 births
American female mixed martial artists
American mixed martial artists of Mexican descent
American sportspeople of Venezuelan descent
American sportspeople of Mexican descent
Living people
Bantamweight mixed martial artists
Flyweight mixed martial artists
Mixed martial artists utilizing Brazilian jiu-jitsu
Mixed martial artists from Washington (state)
American practitioners of Brazilian jiu-jitsu
Female Brazilian jiu-jitsu practitioners
Sportspeople from Spokane, Washington
Ultimate Fighting Championship champions
Spokane Community College alumni
21st-century American women
Ultimate Fighting Championship female fighters